The Florida red-bellied cooter or Florida redbelly turtle (Pseudemys nelsoni) is a species of turtle in the family Emydidae.

Etymology
The specific name, nelsoni, is in honor of American biologist George Nelson (born 1873).

Geographic range
P. nelsoni is endemic to Florida, and southern Georgia. Fossils of P. nelsoni have also been found along the coast of South Carolina from the Pleistocene Epoch, indicating that the historic range of this species used to extend further north. Today, its northern counterpart, the Northern Red-bellied Cooter (Psuedemys rubriventris) occupies this region.

Biology
The Florida redbelly cooter is mainly herbivorous, and can be found in nearly any type of aquatic habitat. It feeds on a variety of aquatic plants including waterweed (Vallisneria and Elodea), duckweed (Lemna and Wolffia), and arrowhead (Sagittaria) species. It reaches particularly high densities in spring runs, and occasionally can be found in brackish water. It appears to have an intermediate salinity tolerance compared to true freshwater forms and the highly specialized terrapin (Malachemys). This species is active year-round and spends a large portion of the day basking on logs. They are noted for sometimes laying their eggs in the nest mounds of alligators. Sex is temperature-dependent with males being born at cooler temperatures and females being born at warmer temperatures with a pivotal temperature of about 28.5 °C. The Florida redbelly is closely related to the Peninsula cooter (Pseudemys floridana) and can often be found basking on logs together.

Description
The Florida redbelly can be distinguished from other similar turtles by its distinctive red-tinged plastron (belly) and two cusps (like teeth) on its upper beak. Like most Pseudemys turtles, this species is a fairly large river turtle.

Export
Florida redbellies are commonly exported for consumption and the pet trade, with about 50% wild caught individuals and 50% captive bred.

Most of US export statistics (as collected by the World Chelonian Trust in 2002–2005) simply describe exported turtles by the genus, Pseudemys, without identifying the species. They are exported by the million, and are mostly farm-raised.

References

External links
Florida red-bellied cooter Southeast Ecological Science Center.

Further reading
Carr AF (1938). "Pseudemys nelsoni, a New Turtle from Florida". Occ. Pap. Boston Soc. Nat. Hist. 8: 305–310. (Pseudemys nelsoni, new species).
Ernst CH, Barbour RW, Lovich JE (1994). Turtles of the United States and Canada. Washington, District of Columbia: Smithsonian Institution Press.
Hubbs C (1995). "Springs and Spring Runs as Unique Aquatic Systems". Copeia 1995 (4): 989–991.
Reed RN, Gibbons JW (2004). "Conservation status of live U.S. nonmarine turtles in domestic and international trade" – a report to: U.S. Department of the Interior and U.S. Fish and Wildlife Service. Aiken, South Carolina, Savannah River Ecology Lab: 1-92.

Pseudemys
Reptiles of the United States
Reptiles described in 1938
Taxa named by Archie Carr